The Brazil São Paulo 500 Years Open was the second of two golf tournaments that were held in 2000 to commemorate the discovery of Brazil by Pedro Álvares Cabral in 1500. They were both included on the schedule of the European Tour, marking the tour's first visit to South America.

History
The tournament was held at the São Paulo Golf Club in São Paulo. Unlike the Brazil Rio de Janeiro 500 Years Open, it was staged for a second time in 2001, when it was titled as the São Paulo Brazil Open.

The inaugural event was won by Ireland's Pádraig Harrington who triumphed by two strokes over American Gerry Norquist. The following year South African Darren Fichardt recorded a five stroke victory in an event reduced to 54 holes because of disruption caused by thunderstorms during each of the first three days.

Winners

See also
Brazil Open

Notes

References

External links
Coverage on the European Tour's official site

Former European Tour events
Golf tournaments in Brazil